Jenna Leah Sanz-Agero (née Piccolo; born November 10, 1969) is the former lead singer of the female rock group Vixen, and a former president of Media 8. She lives and works in Los Angeles, California and served from 2017 to 2019 as Chief Operating Officer, Executive Vice President of Business Affairs and Operations for The H Collective, a motion picture company. Since July 2019 she serves as Director of Business, Legal Affairs and Strategic Knowledge Management at Netflix.

Before joining Media 8 in 2003, Sanz-Agero was a founding partner in the law firm Business Affairs, Inc., which provided business and legal affairs services related to the development, production, finance, and distribution of television and film projects. She previously served as Vice President of Business and Legal Affairs for MDP Worldwide, Media 8's old name.

From 2007 to 2017 she served as President of Lapin Blanc, Inc.

Sanz-Agero received her B.S. degree in Finance, summa cum laude, from Sacred Heart University and her J.D., magna cum laude, from Pepperdine University, and was admitted to the California Bar in 1995.

Previously lead singer of local Los Angeles bands including NoNo BadDog and Belladonna, Sanz-Agero was recruited by Jan Kuehnemund to join Vixen during the Voices of Metal Tour in 2001 with other 1980s bands Slaughter, Stephen Pearcy's Ratt, and Mötley Crüe lead singer Vince Neil. Sanz-Agero provided the lead vocals for the 2006 Vixen releases Extended Versions (aka Live in Sweden), released by Sony BMG in May, and studio album Live & Learn, released in December in Europe and January 2007 in the U.S. She co-wrote most of the songs for the latter album.

In a July 2011 interview, Sanz-Agero confirmed that a second album featuring the 2001 line-up was in the works and revealed the existence of a track called "I Understand" along with other new recordings and outtakes during the Live & Learn sessions. There has yet to be a proper release for these recordings due to Vixen not having a single member from that line-up anymore.

Sanz-Agero amicably left Vixen and her music career in 2013, as Jan Kuehnemund was planning to reunite the classic lineup with Janet Gardner, Share Ross, and Roxy Petrucci; however, Kuehnemund died on October 10, 2013, and was replaced by a returning Gina Stile. On January 21, 2016, Sanz-Agero appeared only for one night alongside Vixen's revamped lineup to perform with them in Anaheim, where, together, they sang "Love Is a Killer" from the band's 1990 album Rev It Up. Future Vixen frontwoman Lorraine Lewis's Femme Fatale served as the co-opening act.

She resigned as Media 8 co-President on September 8, 2006. She later served as head of business affairs and strategy consultant for Foresight Unlimited.

Sanz-Agero co-authored the dessert cookbook Sugar, Sugar: Every Recipe Has a Story (Andrews McMeel Publishing, October 2011) with Kimberly "Momma" Reiner.

Discography
Vixen
Extended Versions (2006)
Live & Learn (2006)
Live in Sweden (2013)

References 

1969 births
American rock singers
American women rock singers
Living people
Pepperdine University School of Law alumni
Sacred Heart University alumni
American cookbook writers
American chief operating officers
American entertainment lawyers
American film studio executives
Lawyers from Los Angeles
Netflix people
Women corporate executives
American women singer-songwriters
American rock songwriters
American women non-fiction writers
Singers from Los Angeles
Vixen (band) members
20th-century American lawyers
21st-century American lawyers
21st-century American singers
21st-century American women singers
20th-century American women lawyers
21st-century American women lawyers
Singer-songwriters from California